Farizi or Ferizi may refer to:

Farizi, Chenaran, a village in Razavi Khorasan Province, Iran
Ferizi, Mashhad, a village in Razavi Khorasan Province, Iran
Johan Ahmad Farizi (born 1990), Indonesian footballer

See also
 Ferizian